In the Fen Country is an orchestral tone poem written by the English composer Ralph Vaughan Williams.  Vaughan Williams had completed the first version of the work in April 1904. He subsequently revised the work in 1905 and 1907.  It is Vaughan Williams' earliest composition not to be withdrawn.

Whilst various 1920 reports indicated that the score was lost at that time, with one saying "perhaps irretrievably" and another "temporarily lost", Alain Frogley commented in 1991 that the manuscript score is in the British Library.

Described by Vaughan Williams as a "symphonic impression", it received its premiere under the conductor Thomas Beecham on 22 February 1909. The piece is meant to evoke feelings of traversing East Anglia's often bleak Fen landscape, illustrated by the solo opening melody, then wide open spaces as portrayed by sweeping string orchestral textures, with a melodic language strongly reminiscent of English folksong, and a harmonic language closely aligned with that of Frederick Delius in his idyllic idiom. The orchestration was altered in 1935 and perhaps earlier as well.

In the Fen Country received its first publication from Oxford University Press, posthumously, in 1969.

References

Notes

Bibliography 

 
 
 
 
 

1904 compositions
1905 compositions
1907 compositions
Compositions by Ralph Vaughan Williams
Symphonic poems